Subcetate or Sub Cetate may refer to several places in Romania:

Subcetate, a commune in Harghita County
Sub Cetate, a village in Zetea Commune, Harghita County
Subcetate, a village in Sântămăria-Orlea Commune, Hunedoara County
Sub Cetate, a village in Valcău de Jos Commune, Sălaj County
Subcetate, a neighborhood of the city of Oradea, Bihor County